Johnny Ningeongan is a Canadian politician, who was elected as the Member of the Legislative Assembly for the electoral district of Nanulik in the Legislative Assembly of Nunavut in the 2008 territorial election. He was defeated in the 2013 election in the redistributed district of Aivilik.

Prior to his election to the legislature, Ningeongan served five terms as mayor of Coral Harbour and one term as president of the Nunavut Federation of Municipalities.

References

External links
. Biography at the Legislative Assembly of Nunavut

Living people
Members of the Legislative Assembly of Nunavut
21st-century Canadian politicians
Inuit from the Northwest Territories
Mayors of places in Nunavut
Inuit politicians
People from Coral Harbour
Inuit from Nunavut
Year of birth missing (living people)